The 1988–89 Idaho Vandals men's basketball team represented the University of Idaho during the 1988–89 NCAA Division I men's basketball season. Members of the Big Sky Conference, the Vandals were led by first-year head coach Kermit Davis and played their home games on campus at the Kibbie Dome in Moscow, Idaho.

At the conference tournament in Boise, the Vandals again earned a bye into the semifinals, where they beat Montana by 21 points. In the final against Boise State, Idaho defeated the host team by seven to earn their first NCAA berth in seven years.

Seeded thirteenth in the West region, Idaho met fourth-seed #15 UNLV back in Boise and lost by twelve.

Postseason result

|-
!colspan=6 style=| Big Sky tournament

|-
!colspan=6 style=| NCAA tournament

References

External links
Sports Reference – Idaho Vandals: 1988–89 basketball season
Gem of the Mountains: 1989 University of Idaho yearbook – 1988–89 basketball season
Idaho Argonaut – student newspaper – 1989 editions

Idaho Vandals men's basketball seasons
Idaho
Idaho
Idaho
Idaho